Benjamin Eli Smith, L.H.D. (February 7, 1857 – March 18, 1913) was an American editor and the son of Eli Smith.  Born in Beirut, Ottoman Empire (now Beirut, Lebanon), he graduated from Amherst College (A.B., 1877; A.M., 1881), earning the degree of L.H.D. in 1902.  He was managing editor of the first edition of the Century Dictionary, and editor-in-chief of the revised edition after the death of editor William Dwight Whitney in 1894.  As the editor, he was also responsible  for the Century Cyclopedia of Names (1894), the Century Atlas (1897), the two-volume Century Dictionary Supplement (1909), and the revised and enlarged Century Dictionary, Cyclopedia, and Atlas (twelve volumes, 1911).  He translated Schwegler's History of Philosophy and Cicero's De Amicitia, as well as edited selections from other works.

References

External links

The Century Dictionary Online Help at www.leoyan.com

American lexicographers
American book editors
1857 births
1913 deaths
Amherst College alumni
Writers from Beirut
German–English translators
Latin–English translators
19th-century American translators